is the third studio album by Japanese actress and recording artist Takako Matsu. It was released on March 23, 2000 through Polydor Records in Japan. The album peaked at number 7 on the Oricon Albums Chart and was certified Gold by the Recording Industry Association of Japan (RIAJ). It has sold 194,000 copies in Japan as of July 2014.

Reception
Itsuka, Sakura no Ame ni... peaked at number 7 on the Oricon Albums Chart and stayed in the top 200 for nine weeks. It has sold about 194,000 copies in Japan and has been certified Gold by the RIAJ for shipment of 200,000 copies.

Charts and certifications

Charts

Certifications

References

2000 albums
Japanese-language albums
Takako Matsu albums